In signal processing and electronics, the frequency response of a system is the quantitative measure of the magnitude and phase of the output as a function of input frequency. The frequency response is widely used in the design and analysis of systems, such as audio and control systems, where they simplify mathematical analysis by converting governing differential equations into algebraic equations. In an audio system, it may be used to minimize audible distortion by designing components (such as microphones, amplifiers and loudspeakers) so that the overall response is as flat (uniform) as possible across the system's bandwidth. In control systems, such as a vehicle's cruise control, it may be used to assess system stability, often through the use of Bode plots. Systems with a specific frequency response can be designed using analog and digital filters.

The frequency response characterizes systems in the frequency domain, just as the impulse response characterizes systems in the time domain. In linear systems (or as an approximation to a real system neglecting second order non-linear properties), either response completely describes the system and thus have one-to-one correspondence: the frequency response is the Fourier transform of the impulse response. The frequency response allows simpler analysis of cascaded systems such as multistage amplifiers, as the response of the overall system can be found through multiplication of the individual stages' frequency responses (as opposed to convolution of the impulse response in the time domain). The frequency response is closely related to the transfer function in linear systems, which is the Laplace transform of the impulse response. They are equivalent when the real part  of the transfer function's complex variable  is zero.

Measurement and plotting 

Measuring the frequency response typically involves exciting the system with an input signal and measuring the resulting output signal, calculating the frequency spectra of the two signals (for example, using the fast Fourier transform for discrete signals), and comparing the spectra to isolate the effect of the system. In linear systems, the frequency range of the input signal should cover the frequency range of interest.

Several methods using different input signals may be used to measure the frequency response of a system, including:
 Applying constant amplitude sinusoids stepped through a range of frequencies and comparing the amplitude and phase shift of the output relative to the input. The frequency sweep must be slow enough for the system to reach its steady-state at each point of interest
 Applying an impulse signal and taking the Fourier transform of the system's response
 Applying a wide-sense stationary white noise signal over a long period of time and taking the Fourier transform of the system's response. With this method, the cross-spectral density (rather than the power spectral density) should be used if phase information is required

The frequency response is characterized by the magnitude, typically in decibels (dB) or as a generic amplitude of the dependent variable, and the phase, in radians or degrees, measured against frequency, in radian/s, Hertz (Hz) or as a fraction of the sampling frequency.

There are three common ways of plotting response measurements:
 Bode plots graph magnitude and phase against frequency on two rectangular plots
 Nyquist plots graph magnitude and phase parametrically against frequency in polar form
 Nichols plots graph magnitude and phase parametrically against frequency in rectangular form

For the design of control systems, any of the three types of plots may be used to infer closed-loop stability and stability margins from the open-loop frequency response. In many frequency domain applications, the phase response is relatively unimportant and the magnitude response of the Bode plot may be all that is required. In digital systems (such as digital filters), the frequency response often contains a main lobe with multiple periodic sidelobes, due to spectral leakage caused by digital processes such as sampling and windowing.

Nonlinear frequency response
If the system under investigation is nonlinear, linear frequency domain analysis will not reveal all the nonlinear characteristics. To overcome these limitations, generalized frequency response functions and nonlinear output frequency response functions have been defined to analyze nonlinear dynamic effects. Nonlinear frequency response methods may reveal effects such as resonance, intermodulation, and energy transfer.

Applications
In the audible range frequency response is usually referred to in connection with electronic amplifiers, microphones and loudspeakers. Radio spectrum frequency response can refer to measurements of coaxial cable, twisted-pair cable, video switching equipment, wireless communications devices, and antenna systems. Infrasonic frequency response measurements include earthquakes and electroencephalography (brain waves).

Frequency response curves are often used to indicate the accuracy of electronic components or systems. When a system or component reproduces all desired input signals with no emphasis or attenuation of a particular frequency band, the system or component is said to be "flat", or to have a flat frequency response curve. In other case, we can be use 3D-form of frequency response surface.

Frequency response requirements differ depending on the application. In high fidelity audio, an amplifier requires a flat frequency response of at least 20–20,000 Hz, with a tolerance as tight as ±0.1 dB in the mid-range frequencies around 1000 Hz; however, in telephony, a frequency response of 400–4,000 Hz, with a tolerance of ±1 dB is sufficient for intelligibility of speech.

Once a frequency response has been measured (e.g., as an impulse response), provided the system is linear and time-invariant, its characteristic can be approximated with arbitrary accuracy by a digital filter.  Similarly, if a system is demonstrated to have a poor frequency response, a digital or analog filter can be applied to the signals prior to their reproduction to compensate for these deficiencies.

The form of a frequency response curve is very important for anti-jamming protection of radars, communications and other systems.

See also

Audio system measurements
Bandwidth (signal processing)
Bode plot
Impulse response
Spectral sensitivity
Steady state (electronics)
Transient response
Universal dielectric response

References
Notes

Bibliography
Luther, Arch C.; Inglis, Andrew F. Video engineering, McGraw-Hill, 1999. 
Stark, Scott Hunter. Live Sound Reinforcement, Vallejo, California, Artistpro.com, 1996–2002. 
 L. R. Rabiner and B. Gold. Theory and Application of Digital Signal Processing. – Englewood Cliffs, NJ: Prentice-Hall, 1975. – 720 pp

External links
University of Michigan: Frequency Response Analysis and Design Tutorial 
Smith, Julius O. III: Introduction to Digital Filters with Audio Applications has a nice chapter on Frequency Response

Signal processing
Control theory
Audio amplifier specifications